The Tullygarran ogham stones are a pair of ogham stones forming a National Monument located in County Kerry, Ireland.

Location

History

The stones were discovered in 1848 after a storm uncovered an ancient burial ground overlooking Smerwick Bay. Dayrolles Eveleigh-de-Moleyns, 4th Baron Ventry moved them to his home at Chute Hall.

Description

The stones are:

References

National Monuments in County Kerry
Ogham inscriptions
Ogham